Felix Gross was a singer and musician as well as a composer in the United States. He was active in the 1940s and 1950s. Down Beat Records Blue Moon collection issued a compilation of his recordings. He also recorded with Chess Records. Gross recorded as Felix Gross & His Sextette and Felix Gross and his Orchestra. Band members he recorded with include Henry Coker, Maxwell Davis, Buddy Floyd, Tiny Webb on guitar, Joe Howard on tenor sax, Minor Robinson on drums, as well as Rolf Beleman, Doug Byers, Albert Elam, Adam Green, and Joe Stone.

Discography

Records
Love for Christmas from 'Savoy Jazz Christmas Blues' (1949) and also off Felix Gross - Essential Rhythm & Blues (1947-1955) / Felix Gross - The Complete Recordings 1947 - 1955
Love For Christmas on Savoy 720, 1146 SLA4434-3
Who Can You Be	on Regent 1019 SLA4435
You Don't Love Me on Savoy 720 SLA4436-3
You're Great To Me on Regent 1019 SLA4437
 Love For Christmas / You Don't Love Me on Savoy 720
 Felix Gross - Who Can You Be / You're Great To Me on Regent 1019

Songs
Love for Christmas off Felix Gross	100 Christmas Blues - Songs to Get You Through the Cold
Peaceful Lovin' off Felix Gross	Love Songs - Rare Vintage Masters
 Don't Make Me Late, Baby off Felix Gross - Essential Rhythm & Blues (1947-1955)	
Let's Get Together off Felix Gross -	Essential Rhythm & Blues (1947-1955)
 You Done Me Wrong off Felix Gross -	Essential Rhythm & Blues (1947-1955)
F. G. Boogie off Felix Gross	Essential Rhythm & Blues (1947-1955)
You're Great To Me off Felix Gross	Essential Rhythm & Blues (1947-1955)
 You Can't Do That No More off Felix Gross -	Essential Rhythm & Blues (1947-1955)	
You Don't Love Me off Felix Gross -	Essential Rhythm & Blues (1947-1955)
Going To Get Straight off Felix Gross - Essential Rhythm & Blues (1947-1955)

References

20th-century American musicians
American jazz singers
American jazz songwriters